Lauren Brown (born 18 April 1995) is an Australian rugby league footballer who plays as a utility for the Brisbane Broncos in the NRL Women's Premiership and the Burleigh Bears in the QRL Women's Premiership.

Before switching to rugby league, she played soccer for the Brisbane Roar and Newcastle Jets in the W-League and for Australia in rugby sevens.

Background
Born on the Gold Coast, Queensland, Brown played rugby league growing up before having to give up the sport when she was 12, taking up soccer, touch football and surf lifesaving.

Playing career

Soccer
In 2011, Brown represented Australia at the 2011 AFC U-16 Women's Championship, scoring one goal. In 2012, she played for the Brisbane before moving to the Newcastle Jets for the 2013–14 W-League season.

Rugby sevens
In 2017, Brown played for Griffith University at the Aon University Sevens and represented Australia at the Oceania Games.

In 2018, she played for Bond University at the Aon University Sevens. In April 2018, she made her Rugby Sevens Series debut for Australia in Japan.

Rugby league
In 2020, Brown returned to rugby league, joining the Burleigh Bears.

On 23 September 2020, Brown joined the Brisbane Broncos NRL Women's Premiership squad. In Round 1 of the 2020 NRL Women's season, she made her debut for the Broncos in a 28–14 win over the New Zealand Warriors.

Achievements and accolades

Team
2020 NRLW Grand Final: Brisbane Broncos – Winners

References

External links
Brisbane Broncos profile

1995 births
Living people
Brisbane Broncos (NRLW) players
Footballers who switched code
Australian women's soccer players
Brisbane Roar FC (A-League Women) players
Newcastle Jets FC (A-League Women) players
A-League Women players
Australian female rugby sevens players
Australia international rugby sevens players
Australian female rugby league players
Rugby league wingers
Rugby league centres
Rugby league hookers
Rugby league players from Gold Coast, Queensland

Women's association football midfielders